Bandō may refer to:

People
Eiji Bandō, Japanese entertainer/sportsman
Naoki Bandō, Japanese voice actor
, Japanese long-distance runner
Japanese surname, especially among Kabuki actors, such as:
Bandō Kakitsu I (1847–1893), Japanese kabuki actor of the Uzaemon acting lineage
Bandō Shūka I
Bandō Tamasaburō
Bandō Tamasaburō V
Bandō Mitsugorō III
Bandō Mitsugorō VIII
Bandō Mitsugorō X

Other
 An alternate name for Kantō region
Bandō, Ibaraki, a city
Bandō Prisoner of War camp
Bandō Station, a train station in Naruto, Tokushima Prefecture, Japan

See also
Bando (disambiguation)

Japanese-language surnames